Nathan Antunes (born 23 April 1988) in Sydney, Australia is best known as an Australian race car driver. Educated at Trinity Grammar School in Sydney, he has raced in a variety of classes throughout the world.

Racing career

Junior Karting
Antunes began his career in 1996 and was Goulburn Kart Club Champion in 1997, 1998 (midget karting) and 1999 (rookie karting).  He was also the North Shore Kart Club Champion and ACT Junior Sprint Classic Champion in 1998 and 1999

In 2001, Antunes made his first appearance in National Championships Junior National Light and placed 7th in the Junior Clubman NSW Championship.  In 2002 he placed 5th in the Junior ICA Australian Championship, 4th in the Junior Piston Port NSW Championship (Junior ICA) and 4th in the Junior Clubman NSW Championship improving on his 7th place the year before.
6
In 2003, Antunes placed 5th in the ICA Australian Championship and competed in the Formula 100 Light Australian Championships aged 14.  Unfortunately an accident in the semi final of Clubman Light did not allow him to complete the season.

Formula Ford

Antunes began in Formula Ford after missing the first race of the season due to age licence restrictions.  He placed 5th in the NSW Championship in 2004.  He competed in one race in his home state of New South Wales at Oran Park Raceway.

Formula BMW

In 2005, Antunes moved to Europe to pursue his career and competed in the Formula BMW UK Championship. Antunes drove for Motaworld Racing finishing 7th in the championship and in the top 5 teams. The season included one win, 3 third placings and 3 pole positions.

Antunes also raced at the Formula BMW World Championship in Bahrain for Motaworld Racing.  He finished 5th – the highest finish for Motaworld racing to date – up from 18th place in qualifying.

Formula Renault

2006 saw Antunes step into Formula Renault car for the first time North European and European Series but did not race the full season.  Racing with Motopark Academy, Antunes raced at Circuit Zolder, also known as Circuit Terlaemen in Belgium, qualifying 23rd and finishing 14th.  He also raced in the Formula Renault 2.0 Northern European Cup at Motorsport Arena Oschersleben in Germany, Circuit de Spa-Francorchamps in Belgium and Nürburgring in Germany.

Antunes also tested at the World Series by Renault.

Formula 3

Antunes also competed in the Formula 3 Recaro Cup German Championship in 2006 with the HS Technik Motorsport team.  At three events Antunes placed eighth, sixth, fourth, third, first and retired due to car failure and took one pole position in six races.

Antunes also tested at the World Series by Renault.

GP2

On 30 October 2007, Antunes tested for Super Nova Racing at Paul Ricard Circuit in France.

Toyota Racing Series

Antunes competed in the Toyota Racing Series in New Zealand with Team European Technique owned by Trevor Sheumatk.  Trevor Scheumatk is the Managing Director of Track Tyres, the sole distributor of Michelin Racing Tyres in Australia and New Zealand. He placed 14th.

A1 Grand Prix

He made his A1 Grand Prix debut with A1 Team Australia in Shanghai, China in April 2008.  He drove in the Rookie sessions for the team, placing 7th and 8th in session 1 and 2 respectively.  This paced the team in 7th overall.

In Brands Hatch in May 2008, he again drove for the team in the Rookie sessions, notching up a 10th and an 8th place.

Career results

† Team result

Complete A1 Grand Prix results
(key) (Races in bold indicate pole position) (Races in italics indicate fastest lap)

Complete Bathurst 12 Hour results

References

 A1GP Brands Hatch

External links
  Nathan Antunes Driver Profile
 Photos by Driver: Nathan Antunes
 NathanAntunes.com Official website

1988 births
Living people
Racing drivers from Sydney
Sportsmen from New South Wales
Formula Renault 2.0 NEC drivers
Formula Renault Eurocup drivers
A1 Grand Prix Rookie drivers
Formula BMW UK drivers
Toyota Racing Series drivers
A1 Team Australia drivers
A1 Grand Prix drivers
Motaworld Racing drivers
Motopark Academy drivers
Australian Endurance Championship drivers
Audi Sport drivers